The 5th Golden Horse Awards (Mandarin:第5屆金馬獎) took place on October 30, 1967 at Zhongshan Hall in Taipei, Taiwan.

Winners and nominees 
Winners are listed first, highlighted in boldface.

References

5th
1967 film awards
1967 in Taiwan